= Rambaldo degli Azzoni Avogaro =

Italian historian and numismatist (1719–1790)

Rambaldo degli Azzoni Avogaro (November 1716 – September 1790) was an Italian historian and numismatist. He was born in Treviso and utilized the town archives to write history of the region. Among his works, Trattato della zecca e delle monete ch'ebbero corso in Trevise, fino a tutti el secolo XIV.
